Songs for Swingers is an album by trumpeter Buck Clayton which was recorded in 1958 and released on the Columbia label.

Reception

The Allmusic review by Scott Yanow stated "Everyone is in fine form on four of Clayton's originals and four swing standards (including "Mean to Me" and "Sunday"). Even though these middle-aged musicians were thought of by some as being a bit passé, they were all actually still in their musical prime at the time and were enthusiastic about their brand of small-group swing".

Track listing 
All compositions by Buck Clayton except where noted.
 "Swinging at the Copper Rail" – 3:28	
 "Outer Drive" – 4:46	
 "Swingin' Along Broadway" – 6:46	
 "Night Train" (Jimmy Forrest, Lewis Simpkins, Oscar Washington) – 6:46
 "Mean to Me" (Fred E. Ahlert, Roy Turk) – 6:14	
 "Buckini" – 5:24	
 "Moonglow" (Will Hudson, Irving Mills, Eddie DeLange) – 6:53
 "Sunday" (Chester Conn, Benny Krueger, Ned Miller, Jule Styne) – 5:15

Personnel 
Buck Clayton, Emmett Berry – trumpet
Dicky Wells – trombone
Earle Warren – alto saxophone, clarinet
Buddy Tate – tenor saxophone
Al Williams – piano
Gene Ramey – bass
Herbie Lovelle – drums

References 

1959 albums
Buck Clayton albums
Columbia Records albums